Thermoelectric acclimatization depends on the possibility of a Peltier cell of absorbing heat on one side and rejecting heat on the other side. Consequently, it is possible to use them for heating on one side and cooling on the other and as a temperature control system.

Peltier cell heat pump 

A typical Peltier cell based heat pump can be used by coupling the thermoelectric generators with photovoltaic air cooled panels as defined in the PhD thesis of Alexandra Thedeby.  Considering the system with an air plant that ensures the possibility of heating on one side and cooling on the other. By changing the configuration it allows both winter and summer acclimatization. These elements are expected to be an effective element for zero-energy buildings, if coupled with solar thermal energy and photovoltaic with particular reference to create radiant heat pumps on the walls of a building.

It must be remarked that this acclimatization method ensures the ideal efficiency during summer cooling if coupled with a photovoltaic generator. The air circulation could be also used for cooling the temperature of PV modules.

The most important engineering requirement is the accurate design of heat sinks to optimize the heat exchange and minimize the fluiddynamic losses.

Thermodynamic parameters 
The efficiency can be determined by the following relation:

where is the temperature of the cooling surface and is the temperature of the heating surface.

The key energy phenomena and the reason of defining a specific use of thermoelectric elements (Figure 1) as heat pump resides in the energy fluxes that those elements allow realizing:

 Conductive power : 
Heat flux on the cold side : 
Heat flux on the hot side : 
Electric power : 

Where the following terms are used: , electric current; α Seebeck coefficient; R electric resistance, S surface area, d cell thickness, and k thermal conductivity.

The efficiencies of the system are:

 Cooling efficiency:  
 Heating efficiency: 

COP can be calculated according to Cannistraro.

Final uses 
Thermoelectric heat pumps can be easily used for both local acclimatization for removing local discomfort situations. For example, thermoelectric ceilings are today in an advanced research stage with the aim of increasing indoor comfort conditions according to Fanger, such as the ones that may appear in presence of large glassed surfaces, and for small building acclimatization if coupled with solar systems.

Those systems have the key importance in the direction of new zero emissions passive building because of a very high COP value and the following high performances by an accurate exergy optimization of the system.

At industrial level thermoelectric acclimatization appliances are actually under development

References

Heating
Thermodynamics